The 1910–11 Istanbul Football League season was the 7th season of the league. Galatasaray won the league for the third time.

Season

Matches
Galatasaray – Fenerbahçe SK: 5–0
Galatasaray – Fenerbahçe SK: 7–0
Galatasaray – Progress FC: 3–1
Galatasaray – Progress FC: 8–1
Galatasaray – Strugglers FC: 1–0
Galatasaray – Strugglers FC: 3–0 Won by decision
Galatasaray – Cadi-Keuy FC: 1–0 
Galatasaray – Cadi-Keuy FC: 1–0
Fenerbahçe SK – Progress FC: 0–5
Fenerbahçe SK – Progress FC: 0–1
Fenerbahçe SK – Cadi-Keuy FC: 0–3
Fenerbahçe SK – Cadi-Keuy FC: 1-0
Fenerbahçe SK – Strugglers FC: 2–2

References
http://www.mackolik.com/Standings/Default.aspx?sId=15831
 Tuncay, Bülent (2002). Galatasaray Tarihi. Yapı Kredi Yayınları 
 Dağlaroğlu, Rüştü. Fenerbahçe Spor Kulübü Tarihi 1907-1957  

Istanbul Football League seasons
Istanbul
Istanbul